The men's 400 metres hurdles at the 2007 World Championships in Athletics was held at the Nagai Stadium on 25, 26 and 28 August.

Medalists

Records
Prior to the competition, the following records were as follows.

Schedule

Results

Heats
Qualification: First 4 in each heat (Q) and the next 4 fastest (q) advance to the semifinals.

Semifinals
Qualification: First 2 in each semifinal (Q) and the next 2 fastest (q) advance to the final.

Final

References
Results

Hurdles 400 metres
400 metres hurdles at the World Athletics Championships